The Amazing Partnership is a 1921 British silent mystery film directed by George Ridgwell and starring Milton Rosmer, Gladys Mason and Arthur Walcott. It is based on the 1914 novel of the same title by E. Phillips Oppenheim.

Cast
 Milton Rosmer as Pryde
 Gladys Mason as Grace Burton
 Arthur Walcott as Julius Hatten
 Temple Bell as Stella
 Teddy Arundell as Baron Feldemay
 Robert Vallis as Baron's Confederate
 Harry J. North as Jean Marchand
 Charles Barnett as M. DuPay

References

Bibliography
 Goble, Alan. The Complete Index to Literary Sources in Film. Walter de Gruyter, 1999.
 Low, Rachael. The History of British Film (Volume 3): The History of the British Film 1914 - 1918. Routledge, 2013.

External links

1921 films
1921 mystery films
British silent feature films
British mystery films
Films directed by George Ridgwell
Stoll Pictures films
1920s English-language films
1920s British films
Silent mystery films